Dan Oppland (born 7 January 1984) is an American basketball coach and former player. A standout player for Valparaiso, he is the third all-time leading scorer for the Beacons, having scored 1,780 points.

From 2006 to 2022, he played professionally in Europe, spending most of his time with the Swans Gmunden in Austria and for several clubs in Germany.

Professional career 
Oppland started his professional career in the Dutch Eredivisie for Donar (then named Hanzevast Capitals after their sponsor). The following season, he played for Plannja Basket in Sweden and also played European basketball with the team.

In January 2008, Oppland signed with Bayreuth of the German second-level ProA.

The next season, he signed in Austria with Swans Gmunden and won the 2010 Austrian Leagues with them. He averaged 13 points per game in four seasons for Gmunden, 14.9 points in his final season.

After a stint in Finland for Namika Lahti, Oppland returned to Germany when he signed for Nürnberg Falcons BC.

In May 2018, he signed for MLP Academics Heidelberg. After one year in Heidelberg, he signed for SSV Lokomotive Bernau of the third-tier ProB. He retired in 2022, starting his coaching career with Bernau.

Coaching career 
In July 2021, while playing for Lokomotive Bernau, Oppland obtained his B-coaching license. In the 2021–22 season, he coached Brenau's under-20 team of the JBBL.

In June 2022, he retired from playing and became the assistant coach of Lokomotive Bernau, under promoted Davide Bottinelli.

Personal 
Dan has a twin brother, Mike (born 1984), who also played for the Swans Gmunden in the 2011–12 and 2012–13 seasons.

References

External links
Nürnberg Falcons bio
ESPN profile
Eurobasket.com profile

1984 births
Living people
Valparaiso Beacons men's basketball players
Power forwards (basketball)
American men's basketball players
Basketball players from St. Louis
American expatriate basketball people in Germany
AZS Koszalin players
Donar (basketball club) players
Dutch Basketball League players
Swans Gmunden players
USC Heidelberg players
Nürnberg Falcons BC players
Namika Lahti players
Medi Bayreuth players